

Austria
 Österreichischer Gewerkschaftsbund (Austrian Federation of Unions)

Czech Republic
 Bohemian-Moravian Confederation of Trade Unions – Českomoravská konfederace odborových svazů, ČMKOS

Slovakia
 Unity Trade Union – Odborová Organizácia UNITY

Finland
 Central Organisation of Finnish Trade Unions (SAK) 
 Confederation of Unions for Academic Professionals in Finland (AKAVA)
 Finnish Confederation of Salaried Employees (STTK)

France
 The 4 large confederations
 Confédération Générale du Travail (CGT)
 Force Ouvrière (FO)
 Confédération Française Démocratique du Travail (CFDT)
 Confédération Française des Travailleurs Chrétiens (CFTC)

Germany
German Confederation of Trade Unions (Deutscher Gewerkschaftsbund, DGB) 
German Civil Service Federation (Deutscher Beamtenbund - dbb) 
German Christian Workers' Federation (Christlicher Gewerkschaftsbund - CGB)

Ireland
 Irish Congress of Trade Unions (ICTU)  Note: ICTU is the umbrella organisation for unions operating in both the Republic of Ireland and Northern Ireland. British unions operate in Northern Ireland, as do some all-Ireland unions, and some Northern Ireland-only unions.

Italy
 CGIL (Confederazione Generale Italiana del Lavoro) 
 CISL (Confederazione Italiana Sindacati Lavoratori) 
 UIL (Unione Italiana del Lavoro) 
 CISAL (Confederazione Italiana Sindacati Autonomi Lavoratori) 
 CONFSAL (Confederazione Generale dei Sindacati Autonomi dei Lavoratori) 
 UGL (Unione Generale del Lavoro)

The Netherlands
 Federatie Nederlandse Vakbeweging FNV 
 Christelijk Nationaal Vakverbond CNV

Poland

 All-Poland Alliance of Trade Unions (OPZZ)

Spain
 Comisiones Obreras 
 Confederación General del Trabajo (CGT)
 Confederación Nacional del Trabajo (CNT) 
 Unión General de Trabajadores (UGT)

Sweden
 The Swedish Trade Union Confederation - Landsorganisationen i Sverige (LO) 
 The Swedish Confederation for Professional Employees - Tjänstemännens Centralorganisation (TCO)
 Sveriges Arbetares Centralorganisation (SAC-Syndikalisterna)

Switzerland
 Schweizerischer Gewerkschaftsbund (SGB)

United Kingdom
 Trades Union Congress (TUC)

Europe
Federations of trade unions